Gadarmal Devi temple is a Hindu and Jain temple at Badoh village of Vidisha, Madhya Pradesh.

Description
Gadarmal Devi temple dates back to the 9th century. The architecture of this yogini temple is a fusion of Pratihara and Parmara styles. It is built similar to Teli ka Mandir in Gwalior fort. This temple houses both Hindu and Jain idols. The temple is made of sandstone with seven small shrines surrounding the main shrine.

It is a 42-niche yogini temple. 18 broken images of the goddesses that once fitted into grooves in the temple platform are preserved from the waist down. It is composed of a rectangular shrine and a tall and massive Shikhara. Vidya Dehejia writes that as a yogini temple, it must once have been hypaethral, open to the sky. The temple, was built by herdsmen, so called Gadarmal Devi Temple among locals, consists of one oblong cell with an entrance porch but without sabhamandapa.

The archaeologist Joseph David Beglar photographed a colossal bas-relief sculpture of a mother and child inside the temple in 1871–2. He called it a figure of Maya Devi and the infant Buddha.

See also
 Vidisha Jain temples
 Khajuraho Group of Monuments
 Nachna Hindu temples
 Siddhachal Caves

References

Sources

External links
 Photo-reportage of the temples on the site

Hindu temples in Madhya Pradesh
Vishnu temples
Tourist attractions in Vidisha district